In mathematical finance, the stochastic volatility jump (SVJ) model is suggested by Bates. This model fits the observed implied volatility surface well. 
The model is a Heston process for stochastic volatility with an added Merton log-normal jump.
It assumes the following correlated processes:

 

 

 

 
where S is the price of security, μ is the constant drift (i.e. expected return), t represents time, Z1 is a standard Brownian motion, q is a Poisson counter with density λ.

References

Mathematical finance
Financial models